Lorenzo Richelmy (born 25 March 1990) is an Italian actor, best known to audiences outside of Italy for his performance as the title character in the Netflix original series Marco Polo. Prior to being cast in the series, he appeared in several Italian television shows and films.

Early life
Richelmy was born in La Spezia to parents Marco and Vivienne and moved to Rome with his family when he was four. He attended Liceo Classico Giovanni Paolo II di Ostia Lido. Having begun his career as a child, Richelmy was the youngest actor ever accepted to the Centro Sperimentale di Cinematografia.

Filmography

Film

Television

References

External links
 

Living people
1990 births
21st-century Italian male actors
Italian male film actors
Italian male television actors
Centro Sperimentale di Cinematografia alumni